Greenfield Township is the name of two townships in the U.S. state of Indiana:

 Greenfield Township, LaGrange County, Indiana
 Greenfield Township, Orange County, Indiana

Indiana township disambiguation pages